The Major League Soccer Inaugural Allocations were signed by the league beginning with Tab Ramos on January 5, 1995. Major League Soccer then distributed to the ten initial teams prior to the beginning of the inaugural 1996 season. Each team was allocated four marquee players prior to the February 1996 MLS Inaugural Player Draft.

Colorado Rapids
 Marcelo Balboa
 Shaun Bartlett
 Dominic Kinnear
 Roy Wegerle

Columbus Crew
 Brian Bliss
 Doctor Khumalo
 Brian Maisonneuve
 Adrián Paz

Dallas Burn
 Leonel Álvarez
 Washington Rodríguez
 Hugo Sánchez
 Mark Santel

D.C. United
 Jeff Agoos
 Marco Etcheverry
 John Harkes
 Juan Berthy Suárez

Kansas City Wiz
 Frank Klopas
 Preki
 Mike Sorber
 Vitalis Takawira

Los Angeles Galaxy
 Dan Calichman
 Jorge Campos
 Mauricio Cienfuegos
 Eduardo Hurtado

NY/NJ MetroStars
 Roberto Donadoni
 Tony Meola
 Tab Ramos
 Damian Silvera

New England Revolution
 Mike Burns
 Giuseppe Galderisi
 Alexi Lalas
 Jim St. Andre

San Jose Clash
 John Doyle
 Michael Emenalo
 Ben Iroha
 Eric Wynalda

Tampa Bay Mutiny
 Cle Kooiman
 Roy Lassiter
 Carlos Valderrama
 Martín Vásquez

References

Major League Soccer drafts